Gymnopilus avellanus is a species of mushroom-forming fungus in the family Hymenogastraceae.

See also

 List of Gymnopilus species

References

avellanus
Fungi described in 1965